Chauncey–Stadium Avenues Historic District, also known as the West Lafayette Historic District, is a national historic district located at West Lafayette, Tippecanoe County, Indiana.  The district encompasses 644 contributing buildings in a predominantly residential section of Lafayette.  It developed between about 1890 and 1952 and includes representative examples of Queen Anne, Shingle style, Colonial Revival, Tudor Revival, and Bungalow / American Craftsman style architecture.

It was listed on the National Register of Historic Places in 2002.

See also
Happy Hollow Heights Historic District
Hills and Dales Historic District

References

Neighborhoods in West Lafayette, Indiana
Historic districts on the National Register of Historic Places in Indiana
Bungalow architecture in Indiana
Tudor Revival architecture in Indiana
Colonial Revival architecture in Indiana
Queen Anne architecture in Indiana
Historic districts in West Lafayette, Indiana
National Register of Historic Places in Tippecanoe County, Indiana